Atherigona hyalinipennis, the teff shoot fly, is a species of fly in the family Muscidae. The larvae feed on the seedlings of crops such as teff. It is found in East Africa.

References

Muscidae
Insect pests of millets